Melaleuca megacephala is a plant in the myrtle family Myrtaceae and is native to the south-west of Western Australia. It is distinguished by its large, hemispherical heads of yellow and white flowers on the ends of the branches and the overlapping brown bracts under them.

Description

The flowers are arranged in hemispherical heads, mostly on the ends of branches which continue to grow after flowering. Papery brown, overlapping bracts surround the flower buds and remain under the open flowers. The filaments of the stamens are white but the anthers on their ends are yellow or cream coloured, giving the appearance of pale yellow flowers. The stamens are arranged in five bundles around the flower, each bundle usually containing 12 to 16 stamens.

Taxonomy and naming
Melaleuca megacephala was first formally described in 1862 by Ferdinand von Mueller in "Fragmenta phytographiae Australiae". The specific epithet (megacephala) is derived from the Ancient Greek words μέγας (mégas) meaning “large” or "great" and κεφαλή (kephalḗ) meaning "head", referring to the large heads of flowers of this species.

Distribution and habitat
This melaleuca occurs  in the Geraldton and Kalbarri districts in the Geraldton Sandplains and Yalgoo biogeographic regions growing in sand on sand plains and rocky hills.

Conservation
This species is classified as "not threatened" by the Government of Western Australia Department of Parks and Wildlife.

Uses

Horticulture
Although not common in cultivation, this species has been known in horticulture for a long time. It is hardy in well-drained soil and responds well to pruning to ensure good flower set in the following season.

Essential oils
The leaves of M. megacephala contain significant quantities of monoterpenes and sesquiterpenes.

References

megacephala
Myrtales of Australia
Plants described in 1862
Endemic flora of Western Australia
Taxa named by Ferdinand von Mueller